John Cunneen (May 18, 1848 near Ennis, County Clare, Ireland – February 21, 1907 Buffalo, Erie County, New York, USA) was an American lawyer and politician.

Life
He came to the United States when 14 years old to live with relatives at Albion, New York. He graduated from Albion Academy in 1870, and began the study of law at the office of John H. White at Albion. He was admitted to the bar in 1874, and commenced practice in Albion. He was a member of the Board of Education of the Village of Albion, and for seven years was Clerk to the Board of Supervisors of Orleans County. On January 26, 1876, he married Elizabeth A. Bass.

In 1890, he removed to Buffalo and formed a partnership with William F. Sheehan and Charles F. Tabor in the firm of Sheehan, Tabor, Cunneen & Coatsworth. In 1894, he became the senior member of Cunneen & Coatsworth. He was a delegate to the 1892 Democratic National Convention. At the New York state election, 1902, he was elected New York Attorney General on the Democratic and Prohibition tickets. He ran for re-election at the New York state election, 1904, but was defeated.

He died of pneumonia, and was buried at St. Joseph's Cemetery in Albion, like his brother Cornelius Cunneen (1868–1890) who had drowned in the Erie Canal. His wife Elizabeth, who died in 1917, was Protestant and so could not be buried with him.

Sources
 Obit in NYT on February 22, 1907
Bio transcribed from Our County and Its People: A Descriptive Work on Erie County, New York edited by Truman C. White (The Boston History Company, 1898)
His brothers death notice transcribed from The Medina Tribune on October 9, 1890
Burials at St. Joseph's Cemetery, at RootsWeb

1848 births
1907 deaths
Deaths from pneumonia in New York (state)
New York State Attorneys General
People from Ennis
Politicians from Buffalo, New York
Politicians from County Clare
Irish emigrants to the United States (before 1923)
New York (state) Democrats
People from Albion, Orleans County, New York
Lawyers from Buffalo, New York